Mine Blower is a hybrid wooden roller coaster located at Fun Spot America Kissimmee, in Kissimmee, Florida. Manufactured by The Gravity Group, the compact roller coaster is one of only three wooden roller coasters in Florida, the others being White Lightning at Fun Spot America Orlando and Coastersaurus at Legoland Florida. Features of the ride include a zero-gravity roll above the station area, as well as a 115° overbanked turn.

History 
In December 2016, it was speculated that Fun Spot America Kissimmee was going to build a new roller coaster for $6 million. The name for the attraction was announced on February 5, 2017, during the 2017 Super Bowl. In May 2017, parts of the roller coaster were revealed during construction, including the 115° overbanked turn. On June 15, 2017, it was announced that Mine Blower would be opening later in the month. Mine Blower opened to the public eight days later, on June 23.

Ride experience
The ride starts with a mild 180° turn to the left, taking it straight into the lift hill. It takes approximately 23 seconds to ascend before the ride hits another 180° turnaround to the left, and plunges just over 80 feet before going into the only inversion, a zero-gravity roll. Then, it goes into the first high speed turnaround of many to the left, leading straight up an airtime hill that's followed by a "double down", then passing another bunny hill, and into a right hand turnaround. Two more small hills follow, and then goes towards the 115° over-banked turn to the right. A few more curvy airtime hills sprint the train towards a low lying, left hand turnaround, up another two hills, and into the brake run.

Mine Blower is one of 8 wooden roller coasters with at least one inversion as of its construction.

Characteristics

Support structure
Mine Blower is a Gravity Group wooden roller coaster that is built with a steel support structure.

Trains
Mine Blower utilizes two custom themed "Timberliner" trains that seat 12 passengers each. The train front consists of a firework and dynamite figurehead.

Statistics
This is currently the longest, tallest, and fastest of the three operating wooden coasters in Florida.

Reception

Note: Mine Blower has not charted in the Golden Ticket Awards since 2018.

See also 
 2017 in amusement parks

References 

Wooden roller coasters
Roller coasters in Florida
2017 establishments in Florida
Buildings and structures in Kissimmee, Florida